GRAVES is a French radar-based space surveillance system, akin to the American Air Force Space Surveillance System. Using radar measurements, the French Air Force is able to spot satellites orbiting the Earth and determine their orbit. The GRAVES system took 15 years to develop, and became operational in November, 2005. GRAVES is also a contributing system to the European Space Agency's Space Situational Awareness Programme (SSA).

GRAVES is a bistatic radar system using Doppler and directional information to derive the orbits of the detected satellites. Data processing and  generation of satellite orbital elements is performed at the Balard Air Complex in Paris, .

See also
 Space Situational Awareness Programme
 Air Force Space Surveillance System

References

External links
 Official website
 

Military radars of France
Bistatic and multistatic radars
Space Situational Awareness Programme